Cigarral refers to recreational estates or mansions located in the south edge of the Tagus river to its passage by the city of Toledo, Spain, with a main construction intended for recreational housing, a secondary building for the guardians (cigarraleros) who take care of the house to be second residence and, most important and characteristic, its large field, which is limited to a minimum of 7000 m2, being common until half of the 20th century surfaces around 20 000 m2.

The origin of the word cigarral is unknown. The most commonly used version comes from the seasonal presence of cicadas in the summer months, which were the main use of these residences. There are other versions that relate the origin of the word to the conjunction of two Arabic words that refer to recreational house.

History
It is given as a false moment of origin in the middle of the 15th century. Once the clashes between the Arab and Christian kingdoms have subsided, some important members of the ecclesial leadership begin to buy land on the other side of the river, on its southern shore, and spend the summer seasons on these farms.

In the middle of the 17th century, the lands of the cigarrales were devoted to fruit trees, the secondary use that would allow the farms to continue.

The use for second residences for the Toledan bourgeoisie continued until the mid-20th century when, as the large areas were not profitable and the maintenance costs of these farms were high, they began to be subdivided into smaller plots.

In 1994, the PECHT, Special Plan of the Historic District, urban planning regulations of the Center of Toledo and the environment of the Tagus, which includes the area of cigarrales enters into force. From that date, with a more difficult splitting of large cigarrales, a gradual change of use of the area began. Hotels and restaurants took over the cigarrales and gave it the character of a tertiary zone destined to house recreation services as it loses its residential quality.

In 2006, in the face of the great deterioration of the Cigarrales area, with the transformation of uses, the first advance of the Special Cigarrales Plan is presented, a document proposed by PECHT to organize the urbanization of the Cigarrales.

Illustrious neighbors of Cigarrales
Miguel de Cervantes places in the Cigarrales to "Don Quixote" in one of the chapters as he passes through Toledo.
Tirso de Molina in 1621 wrote  Los Cigarrales de Toledo.
Galdós, a great lover of Toledo and the cigarrales, was the one that showed these to his friend Gregorio Marañón.

Buildings and structures in Toledo, Spain
Housing in Spain